Mussidia melanoneura is a species of snout moth in the genus Mussidia. It was described by Émile Louis Ragonot in 1893. It is found in South Africa and Madagascar.

References

Moths described in 1893
Phycitinae
Taxa named by Émile Louis Ragonot